Lycorea halia cleobaea, the tropical milkweed butterfly, is a subspecies of Lycorea halia, also called the tropical milkweed butterfly, a nymphalid butterfly in the Danainae subfamily. It is found from the Antilles, Dominican Republic and the Caribbean. Its habitat is the tropical rainforest.

References

Danaini
Nymphalidae of South America
Butterfly subspecies